Third Party Risk is a 1954 British crime drama film directed by Daniel Birt and starring Lloyd Bridges, Simone Silva and Finlay Currie. It is based on the 1953 novel of the same name by Nicholas Bentley. It was produced by Hammer Films as a second feature at the company's Bray Studios in Berkshire with sets designed by the art director James Elder Wills. It was released in the United States by Lippert Pictures under the alternative title Deadly Game.

Plot
While holidaying in Spain, Philip Graham (Bridges) by chance runs into an old wartime RAF colleague Tony Roscoe (Peter Dyneley), now a society photographer.  The pair spend some time reminiscing, before Tony is urgently called back to England on business.  Tony is required to fly home, so Philip offers to drive Tony's car back from Spain at the end of his holiday.  Tony asks him to also pick up an envelope he has left in the hotel safe.

After Tony's departure, Phil is attacked in a case of mistaken identity while driving Tony's car.  When he reports the attack, a local police inspector (Roger Delgado) and a mysterious hotel guest Darius (Currie) both tell him that since his discharge from the RAF, Tony has become embroiled in suspicious and probably criminal activities and has been under surveillance.

Back in England, Phil goes to return the car, only to find Tony dead on the floor of his darkroom.  Phil becomes the prime suspect and, realising that the key to the case must be the contents of the envelope he has in his possession, sets about investigating on his own account.  He quickly becomes drawn into a world of extortion and industrial espionage, focussed on a stolen medical formula which many people seem to want to get their hands on.  Along the way he romances the enigmatic Mitzi  (Silva) and also falls into the sphere of influence of sultry temptress Marina (Maureen Swanson).  Developments lead him back to Spain, where he finally manages to crack the mystery.

Cast
 Lloyd Bridges as Philip Graham
 Simone Silva as Mitzi Molnaur
 Finlay Currie as Mr. Darius
 Maureen Swanson as Marina
 Ferdy Mayne as Maxwell Carey
 Peter Dyneley as Tony Roscoe
 George Woodbridge as Inspector Goldfinch
 Russell Waters as The Scientist
 Roger Delgado as Detective Gonzales
 Seymour Green as	Rope-Soles
 Leslie Wright as Sergeant Ramirez
 Mary Parker as Nancy
 Jane Asher as 	Girl 
 Patrick Westwood as 	Porter
 Armand Guinle as 	Hotel Manager

References

Bibliography
 Chibnall, Steve & McFarlane, Brian. The British 'B' Film. Palgrave MacMillan, 2009.

External links 
 
 Third Party Risk at BFI Film & TV Database
 

1954 films
1954 crime drama films
British crime drama films
British black-and-white films
Hammer Film Productions films
Lippert Pictures films
Films based on British novels
Films directed by Daniel Birt
Films set in Spain
Films set in London
Films shot at Bray Studios
1950s English-language films
1950s British films